Alexander Espinoza Hernández (born December 27, 1980) is a bantamweight boxer from Venezuela, who represented his native country at the 2004 Summer Olympics in Athens, Greece. He qualified for the Olympic Games by ending up in second place at the 2nd AIBA American 2004 Olympic Qualifying Tournament in Rio de Janeiro, Brazil. He won the bronze medal in the men's bantamweight division (– 54 kg) at the 2002 Central American and Caribbean Games in El Salvador. In 2016 on a Professional boxing bout, Espinoza was badly defeated by Filipino Prospect Genesis Servania in Japan.

Amateur results

2002 South American Games
Defeated Ceferino Labarda (Argentina) 20:10

2002 Central American and Caribbean Games
1st round bye
Defeated Carlos Guevara (Nicaragua) 24:15
Lost to Johnny Perez (Colombia) 19:23

2004 Summer Olympics
1st round bye
Lost to Andrew Kooner (Canada) 20:37

Pro career
Espinoza made his professional debut on 2005-03-05.

References
 

1980 births
Living people
Bantamweight boxers
Boxers at the 2004 Summer Olympics
Olympic boxers of Venezuela
Sportspeople from Caracas
Venezuelan male boxers
Central American and Caribbean Games bronze medalists for Venezuela
Competitors at the 2002 Central American and Caribbean Games
South American Games gold medalists for Venezuela
South American Games medalists in boxing
Competitors at the 2002 South American Games
Central American and Caribbean Games medalists in boxing
20th-century Venezuelan people
21st-century Venezuelan people